Kajal Aggarwal (born 19 June 1985) is an Indian actress and model who mainly appears in Telugu and Tamil language films, in addition to a few Hindi films. Aggarwal has worked in more than 50 films and also received two South Indian International Movie Awards.

Aggarwal made her acting debut with the 2004 Hindi film Kyun! Ho Gaya Na... and had her first Telugu film release in 2007, Lakshmi Kalyanam. In the same year, she starred in the box office hit Chandamama, which earned her recognition. The 2009 Telugu fantasy action film Magadheera marked a turning point in her career, earning her critical acclaim. It ranks among the highest-grossing Telugu films of all time and fetched her Best Actress nominations at several award ceremonies including South Filmfare Awards.

She subsequently starred in Telugu films such as Darling (2010), Brindavanam (2010), Mr. Perfect (2011), Businessman (2012), Naayak (2013), Baadshah (2013), Govindudu Andarivadele (2014), Temper (2015) and Khaidi No. 150 (2017). Kajal also played the female lead in the high-profile Tamil projects Naan Mahaan Alla (2010), Maattrraan (2012), Thuppakki (2012), Jilla (2014), Vivegam (2017) and Mersal (2017). She made a comeback to Hindi cinema with Singham (2011), which was a hit, while another film Special 26 (2013) was also a box office success.

In 2020, a wax figure of Aggarwal was put on display at Madame Tussauds Singapore, making it the first of an actress from South Indian cinema.

Early life and education

Aggarwal was born and raised in a Punjabi Hindu family settled in Bombay (present-day Mumbai). Her father Suman Aggarwal, is an entrepreneur in the textile business and her mother Vinay Aggarwal is a confectioner, and also Kajal's business manager. Kajal has a younger sister Nisha Aggarwal, an actress in Telugu, Tamil and Malayalam cinema.

Aggarwal studied at St. Anne's High School, Fort, Mumbai, and completed her pre-university education at Jai Hind College. She pursued her graduation in mass media, with specialisation in marketing and advertising, from Kishinchand Chellaram College. Having harboured MBA dreams all through her growing years, she intends to achieve a post-graduation degree soon.

Career

Film debut and struggles (2004–08) 
Aggarwal made her acting debut in the 2004 Bollywood film Kyun! Ho Gaya Na..., in which she had a minor supporting role.

Aggarwal made her debut in Telugu and played her first leading role in 2007 in Teja's Lakshmi Kalyanam, alongside Kalyan Ram; it did not fare well at the box office. Later that year, she appeared in the Krishna Vamsi-directed Chandamama, which opened to positive reviews and became her first major successful film. In 2008, she had her first Tamil film release, Perarasu's action entertainer Pazhani, opposite Bharath. She had one more Tamil release that year with Venkat Prabhu's comedy-thriller Saroja, in which she did a guest appearance. Although the film went on to become a commercial as well as a critical success, the film failed to boost her career as her role was too insignificant. Her Telugu releases Pourudu and Aatadista opposite Sumanth and Nitin, respectively, did not receive positive reviews, but both were successful at the box office.

Public recognition and critical acclaim (2009–11) 
Aggarwal had four releases in 2009. She first starred opposite Vinay Rai in the Tamil film Modhi Vilayadu, which garnered mixed reviews and was a financial failure. She then appeared in the high budget Telugu historical drama Magadheera, alongside Ram Charan Teja, which saw her playing double roles for the first time. The film, directed by S. S. Rajamouli, received overwhelming critical acclaim, while Aggarwal, in particular, was praised for her portrayal of a princess. Aggarwal was nominated for the Filmfare Award for Best Actress in Telugu and nominated for the award for Best Telugu Actress in the South Scope Awards for her performance. It was highly successful commercially and broke several records, emerging as the highest-grossing Telugu film of all time. Magadheera success turned Aggarwal into one of the most sought-after actresses in Telugu cinema. It was released again in Tamil as Maaveeran in 2011, and was also successful at the box office. Her subsequent releases Ganesh Just Ganesh, opposite Ram and Arya 2 opposite Allu Arjun received mixed reviews from critics, while her performance garnered positive feedback.

Aggarwal's first 2010 release was A. Karunakaran's romantic comedy Darling, which featured her alongside Prabhas and received a favourable response, becoming a commercial success at the box office, with Kajal receiving her second Filmfare nomination for Best Actress. Later that year, Aggarwal appeared in the Tamil thriller film Naan Mahaan Alla, opposite Karthi, which was based on a real-life incident and opened to positive reviews. It was a box office success. The chemistry between Karthi and Aggarwal was widely praised. It was later dubbed in Telugu as Naa Peru Siva in Andhra Pradesh and was a success. Aggarwal's final release in 2010 was another romantic comedy Brindavanam opposite Jr. NTR and Samantha, which received critical acclaim and went on to become a commercial success, while fetching Aggarwal the CineMAA Award for Best Actress.

In 2011, Aggarwal was paired with Prabhas for the second time in the romantic comedy Mr. Perfect, directed by Dasaradh. The film became a critical and commercial success. Aggarwal's performance as a conservative doctor and her chemistry with Prabhas was praised by critics. Aggarwal received her third Filmfare nomination for Best Actress in Telugu for her performance. In May, she appeared in Veera, replacing Anushka Shetty and starring opposite Ravi Teja for the first time. The film received moderate reviews.

In July that year, Aggarwal made her Bollywood comeback after seven years with a leading role in the police story Singham, a remake of the same-titled 2010 Tamil film, opposite Ajay Devgn. It received mixed reviews from critics, as did her portrayal of a Goan girl Kavya Bhosle, with critics stating that Aggarwal had not much to offer in the hero-centric film. Komal Nahta noted that "Kaajal Aggarwal acts with effortless ease. Her performance is good", while Filmfare wrote that "Kajal who looks pretty and has done what she has been told to, but probably deserved a meatier debut". Nevertheless, the film was a hit at the box office. She was nominated for two awards for her performance: the Filmfare Award for Best Female Debut and the Zee Cine Award for Best Female Debut. Aggarwal finished 2011 with the Telugu film Dhada, opposite Naga Chaitanya, which failed at the box office.

Commercial success (2012–14) 
In early 2012, Aggarwal appeared in the Telugu gangster film Businessman, alongside Mahesh Babu, directed by Puri Jagannadh. A Sankranthi release, it opened to positive reviews and was a commercial success. Aggarwal's performance, though limited, was praised by critics.

Aggarwal made a comeback to Tamil cinema later that year with two high-profile action flicks. The first was Maattrraan, directed by K. V. Anand and starring Suriya. The film received mixed to positive reviews from critics. Her performance was well received; a review carried by The Indian Express summarised: "Kajal does with utmost sincerity as the foreign language translator Anjali. It's this trait and her graceful demeanour which makes Kajal a pleasant watch". The second was A. R. Murugadoss's Thuppakki, starring Vijay, in which she played a boxer. Her final release in 2012 was the Telugu romance film Sarocharu, opposite Ravi Teja for the second time. Although her performance was praised by critics, the film received poor reviews and did below-average business at the box office.

In early 2013, Aggarwal starred in V. V. Vinayak's action film Naayak, opposite Ram Charan Teja and Amala Paul. Upon release, it received positive reviews and was a major commercial success. Also that year, she starred in the Hindi film Special 26, a heist drama directed by Neeraj Pandey. It went on to be a major critical and commercial success.

She later appeared in Srinu Vaitla's Baadshah, opposite Jr. NTR for the second time in her career. Upon its release, critics appreciated her performance. The Times of India commented: "Kajal is as usual an eye-candy. She's got a good role and has done justice to her performance. Also she looks stunning in the songs." The film was a financial success. Her final release in 2013 was All in All Azhagu Raja, opposite Karthi, which released on Diwali to negative reviews from critics.

In early 2014, Aggarwal starred in R. T. Neason's masala film Jilla, in which she played a police officer. She then featured in a cameo appearance in the Telugu action thriller film Yevadu. Her next release was Krishna Vamsi's family drama Govindudu Andarivadele, which released in October to positive reviews. It grossed  at the box office and became one of the highest grossing Telugu films of 2014.

Setback and recent work (2015–present) 
Aggarwal's first release of 2015 was in the Telugu action film Temper, directed by Puri Jagannadh, alongside NTR Jr. The film received positive responses from critics and was a commercial success at the box office. Aggarwal played an animal lover and on her performance, a critic from The Times of India said: "Despite her limited role, the actress does well".

Next, she featured in two Tamil films, working with industry-leading actors and directors. In July 2015 she was seen as an entrepreneur in Balaji Mohan's gangster comedy film Maari, opposite Dhanush. Critics rated it as a "regular masala movie" and Rediff noted: "Kajal Aggarwal does have a significant role to play, but their onscreen chemistry just does not work". The film became a commercial success. Her other release, Suseenthiran's action film Paayum Puli, alongside Vishal, received mixed reviews and failed at the box office. Reviewers criticised her character stating: "badly written and has nothing more to do with the script" She also did a cameo appearance in the bilingual romantic comedy film Size Zero.

The year 2016 saw Aggarwal appear in two high-profile Telugu films. She played the lead female role, marking her first collaboration with Pawan Kalyan, in the masala film Sardaar Gabbar Singh, directed by K. S. Ravindra. Critical reaction of the film was mixed to negative, though Aggarwal's performance was positive. A reviewer from the Deccan Chronicle wrote: "Kajal Aggarwal plays the perfect princess and looks beautiful and elegant. In fact, she is a breath of air in the film". The film grossed  worldwide. Her second Telugu release was Srikanth Addala's family drama Brahmotsavam, opposite Mahesh Babu, which was a major critical and commercial failure. Among the female leads, her performance as a "new age girl" was well received, despite the role having a limited screen time. She next starred opposite Randeep Hooda in the romantic drama Hindi film Do Lafzon Ki Kahani. The film received moderate reviews.

In April 2016, she signed another Telugu film directed by Teja, starring opposite Rana Daggubati. In June 2016, she signed for Vivegam, starring opposite Ajith Kumar. In July 2016, she signed for the Telugu film Khaidi No. 150, starring opposite Chiranjeevi for the first time in his 150th film.

In late July 2016, she signed to perform her first item number in Koratala Siva's Janatha Garage, starring Mohanlal, Jr NTR, Samantha Ruth Prabhu and Nithya Menen. The shooting of the song took place in mid-August 2016. That song, titled "Pakka Local", was well received by the audience. In October 2016, the much delayed Hindi film Final Cut of Director released, which was supposed to mark her lead debut. The film was dubbed in Tamil and released eight years earlier as Bommalattam. Her next release, Kavalai Vendam, received mixed to positive reviews, but her performance was praised by critics. In December 2016, she signed for Vijay 61, starring opposite Vijay.

Aggarwal's first 2017 release was the Telugu-language action drama film Khaidi No. 150, starring opposite Chiranjeevi. It received mostly positive reviews and turned out to be a commercial success, with Aggarwal's performance praised by critics. In January 2017, in a poll conducted by the Hyderabad Times, she topped the list of Most Desirable Women 2016.
 In 2017, she appeared in the Political drama Nene Raju Nene Mantri, as Radha Jogendhra, a loyal wife who acts as a morale balance to Rana Daggubati's character. Her performance received praise from critics. She then appeared as lead female role in Spy action film, Vivegam, as Yazhini Kumar, a music teacher and loving wife of a spy. Her performance was again praised by critics. She then portrayed the supporting role in Atlee's Mersal as a doctor, and featured alongside Vijay for the third time in her career and her performance received positive reviews while the film became one of the highest grossing Tamil films of 2017. Mersal went on to join the 2 billion club.

In 2018, Aggarwal had a leading role in the Telugu film MLA. In April 2018, she signed to a Telugu film which also features Ravi Teja, marking her third collaboration with the actor. She also starred in Awe, where she played a troubled woman. Aggarwal later bagged a role in Kavacham.

In 2019, Aggarwal was seen in Comali. She then reunited with director Teja for Sita, where she plays the titular character, an arrogant, selfish businesswoman who manipulates people for business improvement and money.

In 2021, her two films released on 19 March, Mosagallu directed by Jeffery Gee Chin co-starring Vishnu Manchu and Suniel Shetty; and Sanjay Gupta directed Hindi film Mumbai Saga.

In 2020, her role in the Telugu film Acharya, co-starring Chiranjeevi, Ram Charan was announced. It is directed by Koratala Siva and produced by Ram Charan and Niranjan Reddy. However, when the trailer released, there was no clip that featured her, which triggered rumours of makers cutting down her role. The rumours were confirmed by the director Koratala Siva in an interview.

Her first release in 2022 was Hey Sinamika, directed by Brinda, it has Dulquer Salmaan and Aditi Rao Hydari alongside her. The film released on 3 March 2022.

Aggarwal also has an under production film Indian 2, co-starring Kamal Haasan and Rakul Preet Singh.

Personal life 
On 6 October 2020, Aggarwal announced her upcoming marriage to Gautam Kitchlu. On 30 October 2020, the couple got married in a small, private ceremony in her hometown of Mumbai, India, with only the couple's immediate families in attendance.

Kajal made her pregnancy official with an Instagram post and was also confirmed by her husband shortly. She gave birth to a boy on 19 April 2022, named Neil.

Brand endorsements 

Aggarwal endorses a large number of brands. Before starting her film career, she had acted in commercials as a model. She represents Celebrity Cricket League as a brand ambassador. In April 2012, Aggarwal was announced as the brand ambassador for Panasonic. In 2013, Aggarwal was signed by Dabur as the brand ambassador of its hair oil brand Dabur Amla Nelli Hair Oil. She also endorses Green Trends, a salon brand in India. She's also associated with PETA and 'Giving Back' NGO. She has featured in television advertisements along with Karthi, endorsing Bru instant coffee. She has endorsed mobile brands such as Samsung Mobile, Poorvika Mobiles and has featured in advertisements for the Secunderabad-based The Chennai Shopping Mall. She endorses several retail and jewellery stores in south India – RS Brothers in Hyderabad, Chennai Silks, Sri Lakshmi Jewellery AVR in Salem in Pondicherry, Malabar Jewellery, Khazana Jewellery. She is the brand ambassador for Lux, Pond's, Himalaya Herbal Kajal, Parachute advanced Hair oils. She partnered with Aroma Curd and Milk Products and Cherio (juice). She also partnered with indeed, an employment related search engine. She recently became the brand ambassador for edible oils brand, Priya Gold Oils (2020). In July 2022 she began endorsing Mobilla.

As singer

Awards and nominations

Filmfare Awards South 
The Filmfare Awards South is the South Indian segment of the annual Filmfare Awards, presented by The Times Group to honour artistic and technical excellence of professionals in the South Indian film industry.

Nominated
 2009 – Filmfare Award for Best Actress – Telugu for Magadheera
 2010 – Filmfare Award for Best Actress – Telugu for Darling
 2011 – Filmfare Award for Best Actress – Telugu for Mr. Perfect
 2014 – Filmfare Award for Best Actress – Telugu for Govindudu Andarivadele

Filmfare Awards 
Nominated
 2012 – Filmfare Award for Best Female Debut – Hindi for Singham

South Indian International Movie Awards 
Winner
 2013 – SIIMA Award for Best Actress (Critics) – Tamil for Thuppakki
 2013 – Youth Icon of South Indian Cinema
 2018 – Best Actress – Telugu for Nene Raju Nene Mantri

Nominated
 2012 – SIIMA Award for Best Actress (Telugu) for Mr. Perfect
 2013 – SIIMA Award for Best Actress (Telugu) for Businessman
 2014 – SIIMA Award for Best Actress (Telugu) for Baadshah
 2013 – SIIMA Award for Best Actress – Tamil for Thuppakki.
2015 – SIIMA Award for Best Actress (Telugu) for Govindudu Andarivadele

CineMAA Awards 
The CineMAA Awards are presented annually by the Movie Artists Association Group to honour artistic and technical excellence of professionals in the Telugu Cinema.
Winner
 2011 – CineMAA Award for Best Actress – Telugu for Brindaavanam (2010)
 2013 – CineMAA Award for Best Actress -Tamil for Thuppakki (2012)
Nominations
 2010 – CineMAA Award for Best Actress – Telugu for Magadheera (2009)
 2012 – CineMAA Award for Best Actress – Telugu for Mr. Perfect (2011)

Vijay Awards 
Vijay Awards are given by the Tamil television channel STAR Vijay.
Winner
 Vijay Award for Favourite Heroine-For Thuppakki (2012)
Nominated
 Vijay Award for Best Actress – For Thuppakki (2012)

Cosmopolitan Awards 
Awards given by Cosmopolitan magazine.
Winner – Cosmopolitan People Choice Award for Best Actress – Thuppakki

Edison Awards 
Nominated The Gorgeous Belle – For Maari (2015)
Winner The Gorgeous Belle of the year (2016)

Zee Telugu Apsara Awards 2016 
Winner Fashion Icon of the year & Most Popular Female celebrity on Social Media
Winner – Femina Penn Shakti Awards 2013
Winner – Femina Power List South 2016
Winner – Zee Telugu Golden Awards 2017 Best Actress
"Hyderabad Times Most Desirable Women 2016 " -Telugu
WinnerHyderabad Times Most Desirable Women 2016

Zee Telugu Apsara Awards 2018 
Winner Actress of the Decade
Winner Best Actress in 2017

See also 
List of Indian film actresses

References

External links 

 
 
 

1985 births
Living people
Actresses from Mumbai
Female models from Mumbai
Indian film actresses
Indian television actresses
Punjabi Hindus
Punjabi people
Actresses in Telugu cinema
Actresses in Tamil cinema
Actresses in Hindi cinema
Actresses in Tamil television
Jai Hind College alumni
South Indian International Movie Awards winners
CineMAA Awards winners
21st-century Indian actresses